The 2023 League of Ireland season is Bohemian Football Club's 133rd year in their history and their 39th consecutive season in the League of Ireland Premier Division since it became the top tier of Irish football. Bohemians are participating in the FAI Cup and the revived Leinster Senior Cup.

Bohs saw their membership increase from 1,000 members to 2,400 for the 2023 season, an all-time high. They also unveiled the new Mono Stand, an homage to the late legendary club volunteer Derek Monaghan. Thus, the capacity of Dalymount Park was increased to above 4,400.

Club

Kits

Supplier: O'Neills | Sponsor: Des Kelly Interiors

Home
Bohemians home kit for the 2023 season features a tribute to the late club legend Derek 'Mono' Monaghan as well as a return to the club's traditional red and black stripes. The new kit is inspired by the Auld Triangle, the famous song about the eponymous metal triangle housed in Mountjoy Prison, which is located in the vicinity of Dalymount Park.

Away

Releasing their away jersey, Bohs teamed up with Palestine Sport for Life to raise awareness of human rights violations in Palestine. The new away kit will also raise funds to support access to sports for children in the camp of Tulkarem in the West Bank. Ten per cent of the profits from the jersey will provide sports equipment  for the project in Tulkarem. The jersey carries the Palestinian colours and a dove icon below the collar, which symbolises peace. 

The previous season's Bob Marley shirt was in use as an alternate jersey in pre-season.

Third

Bohs retained their Dublin Bus kit from the previous season as an alternate strip. As before, 10% of all sales are donated to Dublin Bus’ charity partner LGBT Ireland and Bohemians’ partners at ShoutOut.

Management team

First Team Squad

Transfers

Transfers in

Loan in

Transfers out

Loan out

Friendlies

Pre-season

Competitions

Overview

{|class="wikitable" style="text-align:left"
|-
!rowspan=2 style="width:140px;"|Competition
!colspan=8|Record
|-
!style="width:40px;"|
!style="width:40px;"|
!style="width:40px;"|
!style="width:40px;"|
!style="width:40px;"|
!style="width:40px;"|
!style="width:40px;"|
!style="width:70px;"|
|-
|Premier Division

|-
|FAI Cup

|-
|Leinster Senior Cup

|-
!Total

League of Ireland

League table

Results summary

Results by match day

Matches

FAI Cup

Leinster Senior Cup

Statistics

Appearances and goals

Player(s) in italics left during season

Top Scorers

Player(s) in italics left during season

Clean Sheets

Discipline

Player(s) in italics left during season

Captains

International call-ups

Republic of Ireland Under 19 National Team

Republic of Ireland Under 17 National Team

Republic of Ireland Under 16 National Team

References 

2023 League of Ireland Premier Division by club
Bohemian F.C. seasons